Saint Leontius (d. 488) was a bishop of Fréjus, in Provence. He was probably born at Nîmes, towards the end of the fourth century; he died in his episcopal town in 488, according to some authorities, though others say 443 or 448. His feast day is 1 December.

The date of his episcopal ordination is uncertain, but most likely it took place between the years 400 and 419. He was clearly a man of eminent sanctity, and an episcopate marked with important results, or else he would not have been from an early date associated with the Blessed Virgin as patron of the cathedral church of Fréjus.

There is reason to believe that he was a brother of Saint Castor, Bishop of Apt, and that consequently like him he was a native of Nîmes. At times he has been mistaken for other persons of the same name, especially for Leontius, Bishop of Arles, who lived at the end of the fifth century. But besides the difference in time, the important events associated with the name of the latter Leontius render the identification impossible.

Episcopate
The principal occurrence during the episcopate of Leontius of Fréjus was the establishment of Lérins Abbey at the beginning of the fifth century. The name of this bishop is inseparably united to that of Honoratus, the founder of the monastery, who was ordained by Leontius. Leontius seems to have played an important part in the development of the monastic life in the south-east of Gaul. Honoratus called him his superior and his father, whilst John Cassian who governed the numerous religious of the Abbey of St. Victor, Marseille, dedicated most of his "Conferences" to him.

The relations of Lérins Abbey to the diocesan bishop were very cordial. Some writers believe that this was due merely to the common custom of the age, but others hold, and not without reason it would seem, that it was the result of special privileges granted by Leontius to Honoratus, with whom he was intimately united in the bonds of friendship. Be that as it may, these regulations, which, while safeguarding the episcopal dignity, assured the independence of the monastery, and were confirmed by the Third Council of Arles, seem to have been the beginning of those immunities which from then on were enjoyed in an increasing degree by the religious communities.

Relationship with papacy
Moreover, the most cordial relations existed between the saint and the sovereign pontiffs. This is proved by the fact that Saint Leo I, after his memorable quarrel with Hilary, Bishop of Arles, deprived the latter of the prerogatives which gave him a kind of primacy over the district of Vienne, and bestowed them on Leontius. It is true that this important event took place only in 445, whilst Leontius had been succeeded in the episcopate by Theodore in 433. That is why some authorities have held that these prerogatives were granted to another Bishop of Fréjus, likewise named Leontius, who would have been a successor of Theodore.

To this the supporters of a loved tradition reply that Saint Leontius abandoned his see in 432 to go and preach the Gospel to the Teutonic tribes, and returned to his diocese in 442 dying only in 445 or even 448. Unfortunately no very solid proof of this apostolate can he adduced. Consequently, it is still quite uncertain whether or not the Diocese of Fréjus had more than one bishop called Leontius. Another tradition, making Saint Leontius a martyr, does not seem older than the beginning of the thirteenth century, and merits no credence. Earlier and better authenticated documents give him the title of confessor, which alone is accurate.

Fréjus Cathedral is dedicated to Saint Leontius, and was the seat of the Bishop of Fréjus from the 5th century to 1957, when the Diocese of Fréjus was united with that of Toulon to form the present Diocese of Fréjus-Toulon. The seat of the new diocese is Toulon Cathedral; Fréjus Cathedral is a co-cathedral.

References

488 deaths
5th-century bishops in Gaul
5th-century Christian saints
Bishops of Fréjus
Gallo-Roman saints
People from Nîmes
Year of birth unknown